Contra dance (also contradance, contra-dance and other variant spellings) is a form of folk dancing made up of long lines of couples. 
It has mixed origins from English country dance, Scottish country dance, and French dance styles in the 17th century. Sometimes described as New England folk dance or Appalachian folk dance, contra dances can be found around the world, but are most common in the United States (periodically held in nearly every state), Canada, and other Anglophone countries.

A contra dance event is a social dance that one can attend without a partner. The dancers form couples, and the couples form sets of two couples in long lines starting from the stage and going down the length of the dance hall. Throughout the course of a dance, couples progress up and down these lines, dancing with each other couple in the line. The dance is led by a caller who teaches the sequence of figures in the dance before the music starts. Callers describe the series of steps called "figures", and in a single dance, a caller may include anywhere from six to twelve figures which are repeated as couples progress up and down the lines. Each time through the dance takes 64 beats, after which the pattern is repeated. The essence of the dance is in following the pattern with your set and your line; since there is no required footwork, many people find contra dance easier to learn than other forms of social dancing.

Almost all contra dances are danced to live music. The music played includes, but is not limited to, Irish, Scottish, old-time and French-Canadian folk tunes. The fiddle is considered the core instrument, though other stringed instruments can be used, such as the guitar, banjo, bass and mandolin, as well as the piano, accordion, flute, clarinet and more. Some contra dances are even done to techno music. Music in a dance can consist of a single tune or a medley of tunes, and key changes during the course of a dance are common.

Many callers and bands perform for local contra dances, and some are hired to play for dances around the U.S. and Canada. Many dancers travel regionally (or even nationally) to contra dance weekends and week-long contra dance camps, where they can expect to find other dedicated and skilled dancers, callers, and bands.

History

Contra dancing is a popular form of recreation enjoyed by people of all ages in over 200 cities and towns across the United States, yet it also has a long history that includes European origins, and over 100 years of cultural influences from many different sources.

At the end of the 17th century, English country dances were taken up by French dance masters. The French called these dances contredanses (which roughly translated by sound "countrydance" to "contredanse"), as indicated in a 1706 dance book called Recueil de Contredances. As time progressed, these dances returned to England and were spread and reinterpreted in the United States, and eventually the French form of the name came to be associated with the American folk dances, where they were alternatively called "country dances" or in some parts of New England such as New Hampshire, "contradances".

Contra dances were fashionable in the United States and were considered one of the most popular social dances across class lines in the late 18th century, though these events were usually referred to as "country dances" until the 1780s, when the term contra dance became more common to describe these events. In the mid-19th century, group dances started to decline in popularity in favor of quadrilles, lancers, and couple dances such as the waltz and polka.  

By the late 19th century, contras were mostly confined to rural settings.  This began to change with the square dance revival of the 1920s, pioneered by Henry Ford, founder of the Ford Motor Company, in part as a response in opposition to modern jazz influences in the United States. In the 1920s, Ford asked his friend Benjamin Lovett, a dance coordinator in Massachusetts, to come to Michigan to begin a dance program. Initially, Lovett could not as he was under contract at a local inn; consequently, Ford bought the property rights to the inn. Lovett and Ford initiated a dance program in Dearborn, Michigan that included several folk dances, including contras. Ford also published a book titled Good Morning: After a Sleep of Twenty-Five Years, Old-Fashioned Dancing Is Being Revived in 1926 detailing steps for some contra dances.

In the 1930s and 1940s, the popularity of Jazz, Swing, and "Big Band" music caused contra dance to decline in several parts of the US, and they were primarily held in towns within the Northeastern portions of North America, such as Ohio, the Maritime provinces of Canada, and particularly in New England. Ralph Page almost single-handedly maintained the New England tradition until it was revitalized in the 1950s and 1960s, particularly by Ted Sannella and Dudley Laufman.

The New England contra dance tradition was also maintained in Vermont by the Ed Larkin Old Time Contra Dancers, formed by Edwin Loyal Larkin in 1934. The group Larkin founded is still performing, teaching the dances, and holding monthly open house dances in Tunbridge, Vermont.

By then, early dance camps, retreats, and weekends had emerged, such as Pinewoods Camp, in Plymouth, Massachusetts, which became primarily a music and dance camp in 1933, and NEFFA, the New England Folk Festival, also in Massachusetts, which began in 1944. Pittsburgh Contra Dance celebrated its 100th anniversary in 2015. These and others continue to be popular and some offer other dances and activities besides contra dancing.

In the 1970s, Sannella and other callers introduced dance moves from English Country Dance, such as heys and gypsies, to the contra dances. New dances, such as Shadrack's Delight by Tony Parkes, featured symmetrical dancing by all couples. (Previously, the actives and inactives – see Progression – had significantly different roles). Double progression dances, popularized by Herbie Gaudreau, added to the aerobic nature of the dances, and one caller, Gene Hubert, wrote a quadruple progression dance, Contra Madness. Becket formation was introduced, with partners starting the dance next to each other in the line instead of opposite each other. 
The Brattleboro Dawn Dance started in 1976, and continues to run semiannually.

In the early 1980s, Tod Whittemore started the first Saturday dance in the Peterborough Town House, which remains one of the more popular regional dances. The Peterborough dance influenced Bob McQuillen, who became a notable musician in New England. As musicians and callers moved to other locations, they founded contra dances in Michigan, Washington, Oregon, California, Texas, and elsewhere. Many Dances require proof of covid vaccination to prevent the spread of covid.

Events

Contra dance events are open to all, regardless of experience unless explicitly labeled otherwise. It is common to see dancers with a wide range of ages, from children to the elderly. Most dancers are white and middle or upper-middle class. Contra dances are family-friendly, and alcohol consumption is not part of the culture. Many events offer beginner-level instructions prior to the dance. A typical evening of contra dance is three hours long, including an intermission. The event consists of a number of individual contra dances, each lasting about 15 minutes, and typically a band intermission with some waltzes, schottisches, polkas, or Swedish hambos. In some places, square dances are thrown into the mix, sometimes at the discretion of the caller. Music for the evening is typically performed by a live band, playing jigs and reels from Ireland, Scotland, Canada, or the USA. The tunes may range from traditional originating a century ago, to modern compositions including electric guitar, synth keyboard, and driving percussion – so long as the music fits the timing for contra dance patterns. Sometimes, a rock tune will be woven in.

Generally, a leader, known as a caller, will teach each individual dance just before the music for that dance begins. During this introductory walk-through, participants learn the dance by walking through the steps and formations, following the caller's instructions. The caller gives the instructions orally, and sometimes augments them with demonstrations of steps by experienced dancers in the group. The walk-through usually proceeds in the order of the moves as they will be done with the music; in some dances, the caller may vary the order of moves during the dance, a fact that is usually explained as part of the caller's instructions.

After the walk-through, the music begins and the dancers repeat that sequence some number of times before that dance ends, often 10 to 15 minutes, depending on the length of the contra lines. Calls are normally given at least the first few times through, and often for the last. At the end of each dance, the dancers thank their partners. The contra dance tradition in North America is to change partners for every dance, while in the United Kingdom typically people dance with the same partner the entire evening. One who attends an evening of contra dances in North America does not need to bring his or her own partner. In the short break between individual dances, the dancers invite each other to dance. Booking ahead by asking partner or partners ahead of time for each individual dance is common at some venues, but has been discouraged by some.

Most contra dances do not have an expected dress code. No special outfits are worn, but comfortable and loose-fitting clothing that does not restrict movement is usually recommended. Women usually wear skirts or dresses as they are cooler than wearing trousers; some men also dance in kilts or skirts. Low heeled, broken-in, soft-soled, non-marking shoes, such as dance shoes, sneakers, or sandals, are recommended and, in some places, required. As dancing can be aerobic, dancers are sometimes encouraged to bring a change of clothes.

As in any social dance, cooperation is vital to contra dancing. Since over the course of any single dance, individuals interact with not just their partners but everyone else in the set, contra dancing might be considered a group activity. As will necessarily be the case when beginners are welcomed in by more practiced dancers, mistakes are made; most dancers are willing to help beginners in learning the steps. However, because the friendly, social nature of the dances can be misinterpreted or even abused, some groups have created anti-harassment policies.

Form

Formations
Contra dances are arranged in long lines of couples. A pair of lines is called a set. Sets are generally arranged so they run the length of the hall, with the top of the set being the end closest to the band and caller, and the bottom of the set being the end farthest from the caller.

Couples consist of two people, traditionally one male and one female, though same-sex pairs are increasingly common.  Traditionally the dancers are referred to as the lady and gent, though various other terms have been used: some dances have used men and women, rejecting ladies and gents as elitist; others have used gender-neutral role terms including bares and bands, jets and rubies, and larks and ravens or robins. Couples interact primarily with an adjacent couple for each round of the dance. Each sub-group of two interacting couples is known to choreographers as a minor set and to dancers as a foursome or hands four. Couples in the same minor set are neighbors. Minor sets originate at the head of the set, starting with the topmost dancers as the ones (the active couple or actives); the other couple are twos (or inactives). The ones are said to be above their neighboring twos; twos are below. If there is an uneven number of couples dancing, the bottom-most couple will wait out the first time through the dance.

There are four common ways of arranging couples in the minor sets: proper, improper, Becket, and triple formations. Traditionally, most dances were in the proper formation, with all the gents in one line and all the ladies in the other.  Until the end of the nineteenth century, minor sets were most commonly triples. In the twentieth century, duple-minor dances became more common. Since the mid twentieth century, there has been a shift towards improper dances, in which gents and ladies alternate on each side of the set, being the most common formation.  Triple dances have also lost popularity in modern contras, while Becket formation, in which dancers stand next to their partners, facing another couple, is a modern innovation.

Progression
A fundamental aspect of contra dancing is that, during a single dance, each dancer has one partner, but interacts with many different people. During a single dance, the same pattern is repeated over and over (one time through lasts roughly 30 seconds), but each time, a pair of dancers will dance with new neighbors (moving on to new neighbors is called progressing). Dancers do not need to memorize these patterns in advance, since the dance leader, or caller, will generally explain the pattern for this dance before the music begins, and give people a chance to walk through the pattern so dancers can learn the moves. The walk through also helps dancers understand how the dance pattern leads them toward new people each time. Once the music starts, the caller continues to describe each move until the dancers are comfortable with that dance pattern. The dance progression is built into the contra dance pattern as continuous motion with the music, and does not interrupt the dancing. While all dancers in the room are part of the same dance pattern, half of the couples in the room are moving toward the band at any moment and half are moving away, so when everybody steps forward, they find new people to dance with. Once a couple reaches the end of the set, they switch direction, dancing back along the set the other way.

A single dance runs around ten minutes, long enough to progress at least 15–20 times. If the sets are short to medium length the caller often tries to run the dance until each couple has danced with every other couple both as a one and a two and returned to where they started. A typical room of contra dancers may include about 120 people; but this varies from 30 people in smaller towns, to over 300 people in cities like Washington DC, Los Angeles, or New York. With longer sets (more than 60 people), one dance typically does not allow dancing with every dancer in the group.

Choreography

Contra dance choreography specifies the dance formation, the figures, and the sequence of those figures in a dance. Contra dance figures (with a few exceptions) do not have defined footwork; within the limits of the music and the comfort of their fellow dancers, individuals move according to their own taste.

Most contra dances consist of a sequence of about 6 to 12 individual figures, prompted by the caller in time to the music as the figures are danced. As the sequence repeats, the caller may cut down his or her prompting, and eventually drop out, leaving the dancers to each other and the music.

A figure is a pattern of movement that typically takes eight counts, although figures with four or 16 counts are also common. Each dance is a collection of figures assembled to allow the dancers to progress along the set (see "Progression", above).

A count (as used above) is one half of a musical measure, such as one quarter note in  time or three eighth notes in  time. A count may also be called a step, as contra dance is a walking form, and each count of a dance typically matches a single physical step in a figure.

Typical contra dance choreography comprises four parts, each 16 counts (8 measures) long. The parts are called A1, A2, B1 and B2. This nomenclature stems from the music: Most contra dance tunes (as written) have two parts (A and B), each 8 measures long, and each fitting one part of the dance. The A and B parts are each played twice in a row, hence, A1, A2, B1, B2. While the same music is generally played in, for example, parts A1 and A2, distinct choreography is followed in those parts. Thus, a contra dance is typically 64 counts, and goes with a 32 measure tune. Tunes of this form are called "square"; tunes that deviate from this form are called "crooked".

Sample contra dances:

 Traditional – the actives do most of the movement
Chorus jig (proper duple minor)
A1 (16) Actives down the outside and back. (The inactives stand still or substitute a swing).
A2 (16) Actives down the center, turn individually, come back, and cast off. (The inactives stand still for the first , take a step up the hall, and then participate in the cast).
B1 (16) Actives turn contra corners. (The inactives participate in half the turns.)
B2 (16) Actives meet in the middle for a balance and swing, end swing facing up. (The inactives stand still.)
Note: inactives will often clog in place or otherwise participate in the dance, even though the figures do not call for them to move.
 Modern – the dance is symmetrical for actives and inactives
"Hay in the Barn" by Chart Guthrie (improper duple minor)
A1 (16) Neighbors balance and swing
A2 (8) Ladies chain across, (8) half hey, ladies pass right shoulders to start.
B1 (16) Partners balance and swing.
B2 (8) Ladies chain across, (8) half hey, ladies pass right shoulders to start.

Many modern contra dances have these characteristics:
 longways for as many as will
 first couples improper, or Becket formation
 flowing choreography
 no-one stationary for more than 16 beats (e.g. first couple balance and swing, finish facing down to make lines of four)
 containing at least one swing and normally both a partner swing and a neighbor swing
 the vast majority of the moves from a set of well-known moves that the dancers know already
 composed mostly of moves that keep all dancers connected 
 generally danced to 32 bar jigs or reels played at between 110 and 130 bpm
 danced with a smooth walk with many spins and twirls

An event which consists primarily (or solely) of dances in this style is sometimes referred to as a "modern urban contra dance".

Music

The most common contra dance repertoire is rooted in the Anglo-Celtic tradition as it developed in North America. Irish, Scottish, French Canadian, and Old-time tunes are common, and Klezmer tunes have also been used. The old-time repertoire includes very few of the jigs common in the others.

Tunes used for a contra dance are nearly always "square" 64-beat tunes, in which one time through the tune is each of two 16-beat parts played twice (this is notated AABB). However, any 64-beat tune will do; for instance, three 8-beat parts could be played AABB AACC, or two 8-beat parts and one 16-beat part could be played AABB CC. Tunes not 64 beats long are called "crooked" and are almost never used for contra dancing, although a few crooked dances have been written as novelties. Contra tunes are played at a narrow range of tempos, between 108 and 132 bpm.

Fiddles are considered to be the primary melody instrument in contra dancing, though other stringed instruments can also be used, such as the mandolin or banjo, in addition to a few wind instruments, for example, the accordion. The piano, guitar, and double bass are frequently found in the rhythm section of a contra dance band. Occasionally, percussion instruments are also used in contra dancing, such as the Irish bodhran or less frequently, the dumbek or washboard. The last few years have seen some of the bands incorporate the Quebecois practice of tapping feet on a board while playing an instrument (often the fiddle).

Until the 1970s it was traditional to play a single tune for the duration of a contra dance (about 5 to 10 minutes). Since then, contra dance musicians have typically played tunes in sets of two or three related (and sometimes contrasting) tunes, though single-tune dances are again becoming popular with some northeastern bands. In the Celtic repertoires it is common to change keys with each tune. A set might start with a tune in G, switch to a tune in D, and end with a tune in Bm. Here, D is related to G as its dominant (5th), while D and Bm share a key signature of two sharps. In the old-time tradition the musicians will either play the same tune for the whole dance, or switch to tunes in the same key. This is because the tunings of the five-string banjo are key-specific. An old-time band might play a set of tunes in D, then use the time between dances to retune for a set of tunes in A. (Fiddlers also may take this opportunity to retune; tune- or key-specific fiddle tunings are uncommon in American Anglo-Celtic traditions other than old-time.)

In the Celtic repertoires it is most common for bands to play sets of reels and sets of jigs. However, since the underlying beat structure of jigs and reels is the same (two "counts" per bar) bands will occasionally mix jigs and reels in a set.

Some of the most popular contra dance bands in recent years are Great Bear, Perpetual E-Motion, Buddy System, Crowfoot, Elixir, the Mean Lids, Nor'easter, Nova, Pete's Posse, the Stringrays, the Syncopaths, and Wild Asparagus.

Techno contras

In recent years, younger contra dancers have begun establishing "crossover contra" or "techno contra" – contra dancing to techno, hip-hop, and other modern forms of music. While challenging for DJs and callers, the fusion of contra patterns with moves from hip-hop, tango, and other forms of dance has made this form of contra dance a rising trend since 2008. Techno differs from other contra dancing in that it is usually done to recorded music, although there are some bands that play live for techno dances. Techno has become especially prevalent in Asheville, North Carolina, but regular techno contra dance series are spreading up the East Coast to locales such as Charlottesville, Virginia; Washington, D.C.; Amherst, Massachusetts; Greenfield, Massachusetts; and various North Carolina dance communities, with one-time or annual events cropping up in locations farther west, including California, Portland, Oregon, and Washington state. They also sometimes appear as late night events during contra dance weekends. In response to the demand for techno contra, a number of contra dance callers have developed repertoires of recorded songs to play that go well with particular contra dances; these callers are known as DJs. A kind of techno/traditional contra fusion has arisen, with at least one band, Buddy System, playing live music melded with synth sounds for techno contra dances.

See also
 Ceili dance
 Country Dance and Song Society
 Dutch crossing
 International folk dance
 Quadrille

Citations

General and cited references 

 
  See chapter VI, "Frolics for Fun: Dances, Weddings and Dinner Parties, pages 109 – 124.
 
 
  (Reprint: first published in 1956 by American Squares as a part of the American Squares Dance Series)
 
 
 
  
 
 
 

  
  See chapter entitled "Country Dancing," Pages 57 – 120.  (The first edition was published in 1939.)

External links

 Contra dance associations
 Country Dance and Song Society (CDSS) preserves a variety of Anglo-American folk traditions in North America, including folk music, folk song, English country dance, contra dance and morris dance.
 Anglo-American Dance Service Based in Belgium, promoting contra dance and English dance in Western Europe.

 Descriptions & definitions
 Gary Shapiro's What Is Contra Dance?
 Hamilton Contra Dances A Contra Dance Primer
 Hamilton Contra Dances Contraculture: An introduction to contradancing
 Sharon Barrett Kennedy's "Now, What in the World is Contra Dancing?"

 Different traditions and cultures in contra dance
 Colin Hume's Advice to Americans in England

 Research resources
 University of New Hampshire Special Collections: New Hampshire Library of Traditional Music and Dance

 Finding contra dances
 CDSS Dance Map – interactive, crowd sourced map of contra and folk dances around the world
 Contra Dance Links – comprehensive, up-to-date lists of local dances, weekend dances, musicians, callers, etc.
 The Dance Gypsy – locations of contra dances, and many other folk dances, around the world
 Try Contra – Find contra dances using ZIP Code search.
 National Contra Grid – Look up dances by day-of-week & City.
 ContraDance.org – Description, Links, videos, and local schedule.

 In the United Kingdom
 UK Contra Clubs
 Are You Dancing – calendar of social dance events in the UK, including contras
 English Folk Dance and Song Society dance calendar – calendar of folk dance events in the UK, including contras

 In France
 Paris Contra Dance

 Video
 Contra dance in Oswego, New York, with music by the Great Bear Trio. 2013.
 Two American country dance films on DVD: "Country Corners" (1976), and "Full of Life A-Dancin'" (1978).
 Contra dance in Tacoma, Washington, with music by Crowfoot. 2009.
 Welcome to the Contra Dance – dancers discuss their experiences contra dancing, set over photographs of contras
 The New Contra Dance Commercial (2 minute look at contra in a few dance halls, see playlist)
 Why We Contra Dance (dancers discuss why they enjoy contra dance, with video of dancing)
 Dancing Community (dancers from Louisville talk about their contra dancing experiences, with video of dancing)
 Contra Dancing and New Dancers (new contra dancers in Atlanta, Georgia, discuss their experience)
 A History of Contra (documentary of contra dancing, spanning 150+ years of dance culture)
 Contra dance in Chattanooga, Tennessee with music by Buddy System and calling by Seth Tepfer, 2019
 The Contra Dance (Doug Plummer's 3 minute slide + video set, with Ed Howe's fiddle music from May 2019)
 Contra dance in Glen Echo, Maryland with music by Elixir and calling by Nils Fredland, Contrastock 4, 2014.
 Contra dance in Pinellas, Florida with music by ContraForce and calling by Charlotte Crittenden, 2017)
 Example Contra Dance Lesson (caller Cis Hinkle explains the basics, with contra vocabulary)
 Contra Nils Walkthrough and Dance

 
Articles containing video clips
Country dance
Folk dance
Social dance